Halus was a small place in ancient Assyria, probably in the neighbourhood of Artemita, mentioned only by Tacitus.

References

Ancient Assyrian cities
Lost ancient cities and towns